Anmol Baloch, is a Pakistani television actress and model.

She is best known for her roles as Areeba in the Hum TV television series Qurbatein, as Anmol in Hum TV's Aik Larki Aam Si and as Sajeeda in the Pakistani-Malaysian co-produced television series Sara Sajeeda on TV3.

Early life and education
Baloch was born on 13 January 1992 in Karachi, Sindh, Pakistan. She did her Bachelor in Computer Science from the University of Karachi.

Career

2016
Baloch started out as model but later ventured into acting. In 2016, she made her debut in the A-Plus Entertainment television series Kambakht Tanno.

2017
In 2017, she appeared in the Geo Entertainment television series Bedardi Saiyaan.

She also appeared in TVOne's Jalti Barish.

2018
In 2018, she guest starred in Express Entertainment's anthology television series Kabhi Band Kabhi Baja in the episode Laila Ka Jadoo.

She starred in Hum TV's Aik Larki Aam Si as Anmol the same year.

2019
In 2019, she had a main role in the Hum TV television film Pyaar Kahani alongside Asim Azhar and Hania Amir.

She appeared in the Hum TV historical television series Deewar-e-Shab which was nominated for the 1st Pakistan International Screen Awards.

She played the main role of Sajeeda in the Pakistani-Malaysian co-produced television series Sara Sajeeda.

2020
In 2020, she guest starred in the A-Plus Entertainment television series Haqeeqat in the episode "Badnaam Mohabbat".

She starred in the Express Entertainment television series Saza e Ishq as Rameen alongside Azfar Rehman.

Baloch played the main role of Areeba in the Hum TV television series Qurbatein.

2021
She currently stars in the ARY Digital television series Khwaab Nagar Ki Shehzadi.

Baloch will be starring in the upcoming A-Plus Entertainment television series Noor alongside Usama Khan.

Personal life
Baloch lives in Karachi and is of Baloch and Pashtun descent.

Filmography

Television

References

Living people
Actresses from Karachi
Baloch people
Pakistani television hosts
Pakistani television actresses
21st-century Pakistani actresses
1992 births